R.I.P. (Recording In Progress) is the ninth studio album by Mexican-American Chicano rap recording artist Lil Rob from San Diego, California. It was released on May 27, 2014 through Upstairs Records with distribution via INgrooves. Unlike his previous albums, Love & Hate, 1218 Part II and Twelve Eighteen Part I, this effort didn't reach the Billboard 200, but only peaked at #42 on the Top R&B/Hip-Hop Albums chart and at #25 on the Top Rap Albums chart in the United States.

Track listing

Chart history

References

2014 albums
Lil Rob albums